State Road 113 (NM 113) is a state highway in the US state of New Mexico. NM 113's southern terminus is at NM 9 east of Windmill, and its northern terminus is at Interstate 10 (I-10) northwest of Separ.

Major intersections

See also

 List of state roads in New Mexico

References

External links

113
Transportation in Hidalgo County, New Mexico